The discography of Soundgarden, an American rock band, consists of six studio albums, two live albums, six compilation albums, eight extended plays, 24 singles and 23 music videos.

Soundgarden was formed in Seattle, Washington in 1984 by vocalist Chris Cornell, guitarist Kim Thayil, and bassist Hiro Yamamoto. The drummer position was originally filled by Cornell until 1986 when Matt Cameron became the band's permanent drummer. The band signed with the independent label Sub Pop and released the Screaming Life EP in 1987 and the Fopp EP in 1988. In 1988, the band signed with legendary punk record label SST Records and released its debut full-length album, Ultramega OK. The band subsequently signed with A&M Records, becoming the first grunge band to sign with a major label. In 1989, the band released its first album for a major label, Louder Than Love.

In 1990, the band was joined by a new bassist, Ben Shepherd. The new line-up released Badmotorfinger in 1991. The album brought the band to a new level of commercial success, and Soundgarden found itself amidst the sudden popularity and attention given to the Seattle music scene. The band's next album was to be its breakthrough. Superunknown, released in 1994, debuted at number one on the Billboard 200 and launched several successful singles, including "Spoonman" and "Black Hole Sun". In 1996, the band released its fifth studio album, Down on the Upside; while successful, the album could not emulate the precedent set by Superunknown. In 1997, the band broke up due to internal strife over its creative direction. Soundgarden has sold 14 million records in the US, and an estimated 30 worldwide. Cornell announced Soundgarden's reunion on January 1, 2010, The band's first studio album in 16 years, King Animal, was released on November 13, 2012. It debuted and peaked at number five on the Billboard 200.

Albums

Studio albums

Live albums

Compilation albums

Video albums

Extended plays

Singles

Notes

Promotional singles

Music videos

Other appearances

References

External links

Discographies of American artists
Heavy metal group discographies
Discography